Skridulaupen is a mountain in Skjåk Municipality in Innlandet county, Norway. The mountain is surrounded by several other notable mountains including Raudeggi and Kvitlenova to the west, Mårådalsfjellet to the west-southwest, and Sandåtinden to the southwest. The Sandåbreen glacier lies between Skridulaupen and Sandåfjellet.

See also
List of mountains of Norway

References

Skjåk
Mountains of Innlandet